Borbo gemella, the twin swift, is a butterfly of the family Hesperiidae. It is found in Africa (including Madagascar) and south-western Arabia. The habitat consists of frost-free savanna and forests.

The wingspan is about 42 mm. Adults are attracted to flowers and males mud-puddle. They are on wing year round, with a peak in March and April.

The larvae feed on Ehrharta, Triticum, Saccharum and Zea species.

References

Butterflies described in 1884
Hesperiinae
Butterflies of Africa
Taxa named by Paul Mabille